Hal Roach Studios was an American motion picture and television production studio. Known as The Laugh Factory to the World, it was founded by producer Hal Roach and business partners Dan Linthicum and I.H. Nance as the Rolin Film Company on July 23, 1914. The studio lot, at 8822 Washington Boulevard in Culver City, California, United States, was built in 1920, at which time Rolin was renamed to Hal E. Roach Studios.

History 
Roach saw significant success in the 1920s with series of short comedy films featuring stars such as Harold Lloyd, Snub Pollard, and the Our Gang kids. The studio produced both short films and features for distribution through Pathé Exchange until 1927, when it signed a new distribution deal with Metro-Goldwyn-Mayer. By the early 1930s, the studio had entered a golden age, with a line-up of many of film's most popular comedians, including Laurel and Hardy, Charley Chase, Our Gang, Thelma Todd, and Zasu Pitts. As movie theaters began to favor double features over single-feature programs with added short films—Roach's specialty—the studio's focus shifted from shorts to features, such as Topper and Laurel and Hardy's Way Out West (both 1937).

In 1938, the studios began distributing its titles through United Artists, selling the Our Gang short film unit to MGM.

In the early 1940s, Roach began producing "streamliner" features—shorter films running 40–50 minutes, intended for exhibition as B movies. From 1942 to 1945, the studio was leased to the First Motion Picture Unit for the production of training and propaganda films, primarily for the Army Air Forces.

With the television boom of the 1950s, Hal Roach Studios shifted to all-TV production and produced Amos 'n' Andy and The Stu Erwin Show. It also housed other independent TV production companies, including The Abbott and Costello Show and The Adventures of Wild Bill Hickok.

In April 1959, the studio was closed due to bankruptcy under the management of Roach's son Hal Roach, Jr. Hal, Sr. returned to try to resurrect it; but by December 1962, the lot was permanently closed. One of the very last screen productions made there was "Two", the Season 3 premiere episode of The Twilight Zone. Filmed on the Roach backlot in the latter half of 1961, the post-apocalyptic tale (which featured rising stars Charles Bronson and Elizabeth Montgomery) made full creative use of the derelict state of the backlot's city building sets, which had by then fallen into serious disrepair, and thus required little extra preparation by the crew. In August 1963, the lot was demolished after several auctions and sales of the company's assets.

Hal Roach, Jr. died of pneumonia in 1972. Hal, Sr. sold his interest in Hal Roach Studios to a Canadian investment group in 1971; he died in 1992. As a corporate entity, Hal Roach Studios survived into the 1980s, managing the rights to its catalog, primarily the Laurel and Hardy films, and sporadic new productions such as Kids Incorporated.  It also became a pioneer in digital film colorization, purchasing a 50% interest in pioneering company Colorization, Inc.

Through Colorization, Inc., Hal Roach Studios produced colorized versions of classic black-and-white Roach films, beginning with Topper and Way Out West, and became the first studio to distribute colorized films in 1985. Roach's Colorization, Inc. also colorized films from other studios as well. On July 17, 1986, Hal Roach Studios inked an agreement with film production company Otto Preminger Films to colorize four black-and-white Otto Preminger's movies for television syndication. On August 8, 1986, Hal Roach Studios and Robert Halmi, Inc. partnered with book publisher Grolier to set up a home video arm, Grolier Home Video, to produce adaptations of Grolier's book properties. In 1986, the company made an offer to buy Rastar Productions, but it was turned down in 1987.

The company was gradually acquired from 1985 to 1988 by RHI Entertainment (today Sonar Entertainment). That year, during the pact, Robert Halmi was allowed to have produce the projects, with Hal Roach Studios handling worldwide distribution of its own products. The company had merged in 1987 with rival producer Robert Halmi, Inc., in which they stated that they would merge into a single organization, named HRI Group, one of them becoming subsidiaries of a newly formed parent company, with business combinations, and the Halmi board decided to retain the services of investment bankers to evaluate the proposal, and Halmi would receive one share of the new company's common stock for 2 1/2 shares they now own, while each shares of Roach's stock would be converted into one share of the new company's common, and Qintex America joined the board in November 1987, which they owned 35% of the stock, donated $115 million and Qintex America would planning on to own 35% of the company's stock and would supply a $70 million donation to the new company, which brought its development expertise in the development and network production of two television movies.

References 

 
Silent film studios
Defunct American film studios
Film distributors of the United States
Film production companies of the United States
Film studios in Southern California
Culver City, California
Companies based in Los Angeles
Entertainment companies based in California
Entertainment companies established in 1914
Mass media companies established in 1914
Mass media companies disestablished in 1961
1914 establishments in California
1961 disestablishments in California
Defunct companies based in Greater Los Angeles
American companies established in 1914
American companies disestablished in 1961